SDSS J141624.08+134826.7 (abbreviated SDSS J1416+1348) is a nearby wide binary system of two brown dwarfs, located in constellation Boötes. The system consists of L-type component A and T-type component B.

Discovery
Component A was discovered in late 2009 from a search of Sloan Digital Sky Survey (SDSS) Data Release 7, an astronomical survey conducted at Apache Point Observatory in New Mexico, United States. It has two discovery papers: Bowler et al., 2009 and Schmidt et al., 2009.

Component B was discovered in early 2010 from UKIDSS Large Area Survey (ULAS) Data Release 5 & 6, an astronomical survey conducted on the United Kingdom Infrared Telescope (UKIRT) on Mauna Kea in Hawaii. It has also two discovery papers: Burningham et al., 2010 and Scholz, 2010. Burningham et al. discovered the whole system (independently of Bowler et al. and Schmidt et al.) by cross-matching the ULAS DR5 against SDSS DR7, and Scholz discovered component B by inspecting the UKIDSS finding charts around already found component A.

Distance

In 2012 was published the first relatively precise parallax of SDSS J1416+1348, measured at the Canada-France-Hawaii Telescope under The Hawaii Infrared Parallax Program: 109.9 ± 1.8 mas, corresponding to a distance 9.10 ± 0.15 pc (29.7 ± 0.5 ly). (Although, two parallaxes with large errors was previously published by Bowler et al. and Scholz).

Non-trigonometric distance estimates are marked in italic. The best estimate is marked in bold.

Space motion
SDSS J1416+1348 has proper motion 165 mas·yr−1 with position angle 32 degrees, indicating motion in north-east direction on the sky. Corresponding right ascension and declination components of proper motion are 88.0 ± 2.8 mas/yr and 139.9 ± 1.3 mas/yr, respectively. At distance 29.7 ly (assuming parallax 109.0 ± 1.8 mas), corresponding tangential velocity is 7.1 km/s. Radial velocity of SDSS J1416+1348 is -42.2 ± 5.1 km/s. (Negative radial velocity value indicates that SDSS J1416+1348 is now approaching to us). Total velocity of SDSS J1416+1348 relatively to Solar system is 42.8 km/s.

SDSS J1416+1348 space motions estimates

The most accurate estimates are marked in bold.

Space motion of SDSS J1416+1348 indicates that it is member of Galactic thin disk population.

Solar encounter
Since SDSS J1416+1348 moves much faster in radial direction than in tangential direction, and radial velocity is negative, this brown dwarf system should pass the Solar System in the future at a much smaller distance than today's distance. Proper motion and radial velocity values from Schmidt et al., 2009 and parallax from  Dupuy & Liu, 2012, assuming motion with constant velocity along straight line, yield minimal distance 4.9 ly circa year 207100.

Solar encounter chronology, assuming motion with constant velocity in a straight line relative to the Solar System:

System's properties
SDSS J1416+1348 is an old system (age estimates: >0.8 Gyr, ~10 Gyr, ~5 Gyr, 2–10 Gyr, >3.2 Gyr), and, probably, possesses low metallicity. Its two components are separated at angular distance 9.81 arcsec, corresponding to a projected separation 89.3 ± 1.5 a. u. The system's orbit semi-major axis estimate is 104 a. u.

Component A
The primary (brighter) component (SDSS J141624.08+134826.7 is its full designation; also known as SDSS J1416+13A) is a brown dwarf of spectral type sdL7, or L6, or L5, or d/sdL7. It has unusually blue near-infrared J−KS color. According to Cushing et al. 2010, its peculiar spectrum is primarily a result of thin condensate clouds, and also vertical mixing occurs in its atmosphere. However, in Burgasser et al., 2010 it was suggested that its (as well as component's B) peculiarities arise from age or metallicity, rather than cloud properties alone (since both A and B components have common peculiarities).

Component B
The secondary (fainter) component (ULAS J141623.94+134836.3, abbreviated to ULAS J1416+1348, also known as SDSS J1416+13B) is a brown dwarf of spectral type T7.5, or T7.5p. It has unusually extremely blue near-infrared color H−K, very red optical-to-near-infrared color (z−Y > +2.3 and z−J > +3.1), and extremely red color H−[4.5] = 4.86 ± 0.04 (it was suggested, that the latter may be explained by presence of a cooler unresolved companion to SDSS J1416+13B). Also, its spectrum indicates high surface gravity and/or subsolar metallicity.

See also
 List of star systems within 25–30 light-years
 2M1101AB
 UScoCTIO 108
 Oph 162225-240515
 Binary brown dwarfs

Notes

References

Brown dwarfs
L-type stars
T-type stars
Binary stars
Boötes
SDSS objects
ULAS objects